Hobson County was one of the counties of New Zealand in the North Island, from 1876 until 1989. It came into existence in November 1876, when the provinces were abolished. In 1908, the town of Dargaville and neighboroughing Mangawhare split from Hobson County to form Dargaville Borough. In the 1989 local government reforms, Hobson County re-amalgamated with Dargaville Borough and merged with Otamatea County and parts of Rodney County and Whangarei County to create Kaipara District.

See also 
 List of former territorial authorities in New Zealand § Counties

References

Counties of New Zealand
Politics of the Northland Region